This is a list of all Welsh Government ministerial teams which have existed since the introduction of devolution for Wales in 1999. Since the onset of devolution in Wales in 1999, each Welsh Government administration has been led by the Labour Party.

Ministries of the Welsh Government

See also 
List of British governments
List of Northern Ireland Executives
List of Scottish Governments

Welsh Government
Wales
Assembly Governments
 
Wales